The Gabo Island Lighthouse is an active lighthouse located on Gabo Island, Victoria, Australia.

History
In 1846 begun the works to erect a lighthouse on the island but the funds were sufficient only to excavate the foundations. The first island lighthouse was a wooden tower built in 1853; the current tower was completed in 1862. It is made from pink granite quarried from the island itself. The lighthouse is Australia's second tallest.
In 1917 the light was fitted with an incandescent kerosene mantle; then was upgraded in 1935 with the mains power by diesel generator and the 1,000 watt halogen lamp producing an intensity of 900,000 candela.

A keeper's house is occupied by a caretaker; another building may be rented for overnight stays.

See also

 List of lighthouses in Australia

References

Lighthouses in Victoria (Australia)
Lighthouses completed in 1862
1862 establishments in Australia
Commonwealth Heritage List places in Victoria
Victorian Heritage Register
Unincorporated areas of Victoria (Australia)